Helbig is a German surname. Notable people with the surname include:

 Allen Helbig (born 1964), American artist, graphic designer, illustrator, animator, photographer
 Don Helbig
 Grace Helbig (born 1985), American comedian, actress and internet personality
 Joachim Helbig (1915–1985), officer and pilot in the German Luftwaffe bomber arm
 Kurt Helbig (1901–1975), German weightlifter
 Sebastian Helbig (born 1977), German footballer
 Sven Helbig, German composer, director and music producer
 Thomas Helbig (born 1967), German artist
 Wolfgang Helbig (1839–1915), German classical archaeologist

See also 
 Knippers Helbig, engineering firm based in Stuttgart and New York City

German-language surnames